This is an alphabetical list of cricketers who have played for South East Stars since their founding in 2020. They first played in the Rachael Heyhoe Flint Trophy, a 50 over competition that began in 2020. In 2021, the Twenty20 Charlotte Edwards Cup was added to the women's domestic structure in England.

Players' names are followed by the years in which they were active as a South East Stars player. Seasons given are first and last seasons; the player did not necessarily play in all the intervening seasons. Current players are shown as active to the latest season in which they played for the club. This list only includes players who appeared in at least one match for South East Stars; players who were named in the team's squad for a season but did not play a match are not included.

B
 Megan Belt (2020)
 Madeleine Blinkhorn-Jones (2022)
 Maxine Blythin (2020)
 Chloe Brewer (2020–2022)

C
 Alice Capsey (2020–2022)
 Kira Chathli (2021–2022)
 Aylish Cranstone (2020–2022)

D
 Alice Davidson-Richards (2020–2022)
 Freya Davies (2020–2022)
 Sophia Dunkley (2020–2022)

F
 Tash Farrant (2020–2022)
 Phoebe Franklin (2020–2022)

G
 Grace Gibbs (2020–2022)
 Amy Gordon (2020)
 Eva Gray (2020–2022)
 Danielle Gregory (2020–2022)

J
 Emma Jones (2021–2022)
 Hannah Jones (2020)

M
 Ryana MacDonald-Gay (2021–2022)
 Bethan Miles (2022)
 Kalea Moore (2021–2022)

R
 Suzie Rowe (2020–2021)

S
 Bryony Smith (2020–2022)
 Lauren Smith (2022)
 Rhianna Southby (2020–2022)
 Jemima Spence (2022)
 Alexa Stonehouse (2021–2022)

W
 Kirstie White (2020–2022)

Captains

See also
 List of Surrey Stars cricketers

References

South East Stars